You're Not As _ As You Think is the third studio album by American emo band Sorority Noise. Produced by Mike Sapone, the album was released on March 17, 2017, through Triple Crown Records. The album is available to purchase on Bandcamp.

Background 
You're Not As _ As You Think contains more reflective lyricism than Sorority Noise's previous efforts. The band described the album as an "emotional bulldozer". The main lyrical themes include depression and death of close friends. You're Not As _ As You Think has been described as emo, indie rock, pop punk and alternative rock.

Reception 

You're Not As _ As You Think received acclaim from music critics. At Metacritic, which assigns a normalized rating out of 100 to reviews from mainstream critics, the album has received an average score of 81, based on thirteen reviews, indicating "universal acclaim". Pitchfork gave it an 8/10, saying, "Sorority Noise know brutal honesty can be uncomfortable, but they employ it so well on their latest album, a rafter-reaching emo record about the raw stages of grief and loneliness." Rock Sound stated that the album is "Melancholy at its finest." Jessica Goodman from DIY praised "A Portrait Of" saying "Giving voice to anxieties and doubts only to shatter through them with a screaming crescendo of steadfast resolve, this is the sound of Sorority Noise at their strongest."

Accolades

Track listing

Personnel 
 Cameron Boucher – vocals, rhythm guitar
 Ryan McKenna – bass, vocals
 Adam Ackerman – lead guitar, keys, vocals
 Charlie Singer – drums

Charts

References 

2017 albums
Sorority Noise albums
Triple Crown Records albums
Albums produced by Mike Sapone
Articles with underscores in the title